A household is said to be in  fuel poverty when its members cannot afford to keep adequately warm at a reasonable cost, given their income. The term is mainly used in the UK, Ireland and New Zealand, although discussions on fuel poverty are increasing across Europe, and the concept also applies everywhere in the world where poverty and cold may be present.

Causes
Fuel poverty is caused by a convergence of three factors:
 low income, which is often linked to absolute poverty
 high fuel prices, including the use of relatively expensive fuel sources (such as electricity in the UK, aggravated by higher tariffs for low-volume energy users)
 poor energy efficiency of a home, such as through low levels of insulation and old or inefficient heating systems
The sharp rise in fuel prices from 2006 to 2008 has led to an estimated doubling of the numbers in fuel poverty in countries in which it is a major problem.

A number of illnesses including cancer can exacerbate the problems associated with fuel poverty.

An unprecedented global energy crisis and significant rise in the cost of fossil fuels in 2022 caused many governments to try to shelter consumers from higher energy prices and to accelerate the transition to clean energy technologies. Renewable energy has great potential to reduce prices and dependence on fossil fuels in short and long term.

Eastern Europe 
In eastern Europe (transition economies), the term energy poverty is sometimes used instead.  However, this use of the term (which is about a lack of access to energy services due to economic poverty) can be confused with indicating a lack of any access to energy infrastructure, as has been used by the World Economic Forum when establishing its Energy Poverty Action (EPA) initiative in 2005 to address energy poverty in the developing world by implementing electrification schemes (grid-extension and off-grid).

European Union 
Nine percent of the EU population could not afford to heat their home sufficiently with Bulgaria scoring the highest of 39.2%.

United Kingdom 

In the UK, fuel poverty is defined by the Warm Homes and Energy Conservation Act as: “a person is to be regarded as living "in fuel poverty" if he is a member of a household living on a lower income in a home which cannot be kept warm at reasonable cost”. Statistically, this used to be defined as a household needing to spend more than 10% of its income to maintain an adequate heating regime. However, definitions of "income" and "adequate heating regime" vary between UK Government and Devolved Administrations. A new, more complex definition of fuel poverty is now used in the UK, based on the Hills review. This gave the following definition: fuel poverty is now defined as when a household’s required fuel costs are above the median level, and if they were to spend what is required, then the household would be left with a residual income below the official poverty line. Additionally, a Fuel Poverty Indicator has been created, which shows how far into fuel poverty households are, not simply if they are in poverty or not.

Fuel poverty has been the focus of political action since the early 1970s. In early 2008 it was estimated by Energywatch that there were around 4.4 million households in fuel poverty in the UK, with just over 3 million in England alone: this was more than double the number in 2003. By April 2011 a YouGov survey indicated that the number of households in fuel poverty had risen to 6.3 million households, representing approximately 24% of all households in the UK.

See also

 National Energy Action (NEA)

References 

Energy economics
Energy policy
Measurements and definitions of poverty
Poverty
Heating